Augochlorella pomoniella is a species of sweat bee in the family Halictidae.

References

Further reading

 "Phylogenetic relationships among superfamilies of Hymenoptera", Sharkey M.J., Carpenter J.M., Vilhelmsen L., et al. 2012. Cladistics 28(1): 80–112.
 
 Sharkey M.J. (2007). Phylogeny and Classification of Hymenoptera.

Halictidae
Insects described in 1915